Dives-sur-Mer (literally Dives on Sea) is a commune in the Calvados department in Normandy in northwestern France.

History
It was from harbour of Dives-sur-Mer that William the Conqueror set out on the Norman Conquest of England in 1066. A monumental plaque in the church lists the companions of the Conqueror. The medieval wooden market hall and the 13th-14th-century church are the main attractions of the town.

Population

Transport
Dives-sur-Mer is served by two stations on the railway line from Deauville to Dives-sur-Mer: Gare de Dives-Cabourg and the station Dives-sur-Mer-Port-Guillaume. Train services operate year-round at weekends as well as on weekdays during the summer season. Dives is also on line no. 20 of the Calvados bus company Bus Verts du Calvados.

See also
Communes of the Calvados department

References

External links

Official site

Communes of Calvados (department)
Calvados communes articles needing translation from French Wikipedia
Populated coastal places in France